Gerald Blake may refer to:

 Gerald Blake (academic), British academic
 Gerald Blake (cricketer) (born 1944), South African cricketer
 Gerald Blake (director) (1928–1991), British television director